Petros "Pete" Sampras (born August 12, 1971) is an American former world No. 1 tennis player. Sampras is regarded as one of the greatest tennis players of all time. His professional career began in 1988 and ended at the 2002 US Open, which he won, defeating his longtime rival Andre Agassi in the final. Sampras won 14 major singles titles during his career, which was an all-time record at the time of his retirement: a then-record seven Wimbledon titles, two Australian Opens and a joint Open Era record five US Open titles. He won 64 singles titles in total. He first reached the world No. 1 ranking in 1993, and held that position for a total of 286 weeks (third all time), including an Open Era record of six consecutive Year-End No. 1 rankings from 1993 to 1998. A right-handed player with a single-handed backhand, his precise and powerful serve earned him the nickname "Pistol Pete". In 2007, he was inducted into the International Tennis Hall of Fame.

Early life
Petros Sampras was born on August 12, 1971 in Washington, D.C. He is the third child of Soterios "Sammy" and Georgia (née Vroustouris) Sampras. His mother emigrated from Sparta, Greece, and his father was born in the United States to a Greek father, Costas "Gus" Sampras, and a Polish-Jewish mother, Sarah Steinberg. He attended regular services of the Greek Orthodox Church on Sundays. At the age of 3, he discovered a tennis racket in the basement of his home and spent hours hitting balls against the wall.

In 1978, the Sampras family moved to Palos Verdes, California, and the warmer climate there allowed the seven year-old Sampras to play tennis for most of the year. From early on, his great idol was Rod Laver, and at the age of 11, Sampras met and played tennis with the legend. The Sampras family joined the Jack Kramer Club, and it was here that Sampras's talent became apparent. As a teenager, Sampras trained with tennis coach Robert Lansdorp. The forehand he learned from Lansdorp was the same forehand he used throughout his career. The key was an emphasis on driving through the ball and not hitting extreme topspin. He was spotted by Dr. Peter Fischer, a pediatrician and tennis enthusiast, who coached Sampras until 1989. Fischer was responsible for converting Sampras's double-handed backhand to single-hand with the goal of being better prepared to win Wimbledon.

Professional career

1988: Turning professional
Sampras turned professional in 1988, at the age of 16, and finished the year ranked world No. 97 after starting the year at No. 893. His first professional match was a loss to Sammy Giammalva, Jr. at the February Ebel U.S. Pro Indoor in Philadelphia. However, just one week later, at the Lipton International Players Championships in Miami, Sampras defeated two top-40 players, before losing to No. 18 Emilio Sánchez. He did not defeat another top-40 player for almost six months, at which point he defeated No. 39 Michiel Schapers at a US Open warm-up tournament in Rye Brook, New York. In his first Grand Slam singles match, Sampras lost to No. 69 Jaime Yzaga of Peru in the first round of the US Open. Sampras did not advance past the quarterfinals in his next three tournaments, although he did record wins over No. 79 Jim Courier in their first career match-up, along with defeating No. 8 Tim Mayotte.

1989: First major match wins
The following year, Sampras slightly improved his ranking to a year-ending No. 81. He lost in the first round of the 1989 Australian Open to Christian Saceanu and, at that year's French Open, won a Grand Slam singles match for the first time in his career; in the second round he lost to eventual champion and fellow American teenager Michael Chang in their first career match-up. A few weeks later, Sampras lost in the first round of Wimbledon to Todd Woodbridge. At the US Open, Sampras defeated defending champion and fifth-seeded Mats Wilander in the second round before losing to No. 13 Jay Berger in the fourth round. To end the year, Sampras lost in the first round in four consecutive tournaments.

1990: US Open champion
He lost to Wilander in the quarterfinals of the tournament in Sydney. At the Australian Open, Sampras upset twelfth-ranked Mayotte in the first round before losing to thirteenth-ranked Yannick Noah in the fourth round in four sets. His first professional singles title came in February at the Ebel U.S. Pro Indoor in Philadelphia, where he defeated sixth-ranked Andre Agassi, eighth-ranked Mayotte, and eighteenth-ranked Andrés Gómez in the final. This title elevated his ranking into the top 20 for the first time. Sampras finished 1990 at No. 5, having started the year ranked No. 61 just prior to the start of the Australian Open.

Sampras did not play in the 1990 French Open and again lost in the first round of Wimbledon, this time to Christo van Rensburg. Sampras played seven consecutive weeks during the North American summer hard-court season. He defeated John McEnroe in the quarterfinals of the Canadian Open, but then lost to Chang in the semifinals. He also reached the semifinals of the tournament in Los Angeles, where he lost to No. 2 Stefan Edberg. He did not advance past the quarterfinals in his next three tournaments, losing to Chang, Richey Reneberg, and Goran Ivanišević.

In September, Sampras (youngest male player ever) captured his first Grand Slam title, at the US Open. Along the way, he defeated sixth-ranked Thomas Muster in the fourth round and third-ranked Ivan Lendl in a five-set quarterfinal, breaking Lendl's streak of eight consecutive US Open finals. He then defeated 20th-ranked McEnroe in a four-set semifinal to set up a final with fourth-ranked Agassi. Sampras beat Agassi in straight sets to become the US Open's youngest-ever male singles champion at the age of 19 years and 28 days. He played five more tournaments and won the Grand Slam Cup to complete his year.

1991: Year-end title

In 1991, Sampras captured the first of his five career titles at the year-end Tennis Masters Cup. Upon entering the US Open as the defending champion that year, he caused controversy when, after losing in the quarterfinals to Jim Courier, Sampras said that he was not disappointed and felt relieved that the pressure to defend his title was no longer on him. This led to widespread criticism, which included disparaging remarks from Courier and Jimmy Connors.

1992: First Masters title
In 1992, Sampras reached the quarterfinals of the French Open for the first of three consecutive years, made it to the Wimbledon semifinals, and was the runner-up at the US Open to Stefan Edberg. Sampras later stated that his loss in the US Open final that year was a "wake-up call" and that he needed to figure out how to become the world No. 1. He also played doubles with John McEnroe on the US team that won the Davis Cup on home soil, beating Switzerland 3-1.

1992 was also the year when Sampras made his only competitive appearance at the Olympics. The event was played on clay, his worst surface. Nonetheless, Sampras advanced to the third round before giving up a two-set lead and losing to Andrei Cherkasov of Russia.

1993: Two major titles, world No. 1 
Sampras reached the semifinals of the Australian Open in early 1993, losing again to Stefan Edberg and matching the previous year's quarterfinal performance at the French Open. In April 1993, Sampras attained the No. 1 ranking for the first time. His rise to the top of the rankings was controversial because he had not recently won any Grand Slam titles, but he justified his ranking three months later by claiming his first of seven Wimbledon titles, beating former world No. 1 and fellow American Jim Courier in the final. This was followed by his second US Open title. He finished the year as the clear No. 1 and set a new ATP Tour record that year by becoming the first player to serve more than 1,000 aces in a season.

1994: Australian and Wimbledon titles
Sampras won the first of two Australian Open titles in 1994, defeating American Todd Martin in the final. He then defended his Wimbledon later that year, beating Ivanisevic in the final.  Criticisms were made about the length of the points, as only three rallies contained more than five shots.

1995: Wimbledon and US titles, world No. 1
In 1995, Sampras battled for the world No. 1 ranking with compatriot Andre Agassi, whom he faced in two grand slam finals. He won two grand slam titles on the year and was the key figure for champion United States in the Davis Cup, beating Russia in the final in Moscow 3-2. Sampras was included in all of the three wins. After the opening match (a 5-set thriller against Chesnokov) Sampras was so exhausted that he collapsed and needed help to get into the locker room.

Sampras experienced one of the most emotional matches of his career against Courier in the quarterfinals of the Australian Open. Sampras' longtime coach and close friend, Tim Gullikson, had mysteriously collapsed during the tournament and was forced to return to the United States. Gullikson was later diagnosed with brain cancer, to which he succumbed the following year. Saddened by Gullikson's illness, Sampras began visibly weeping during the match when a spectator shouted at Sampras, urging him to win it for Gullikson. Sampras nevertheless managed to defeat Courier, but lost the final to Andre Agassi in four sets. Paul Annacone took over as Sampras' full-time coach after Gullikson's illness made it impossible for him to continue coaching.

Sampras defeated Agassi in the final at Indian Wells and then won his third straight Wimbledon title over Boris Becker. Sampras lost in the final of the Canadian Masters to Agassi and then beat Agassi in the final of the US Open.

1996: Only Wimbledon loss over 8-years
In the year's first major, the Australian Open, the top-seeded Sampras lost to the unseeded Mark Philippoussis 6–4, 7-6(11–9), 7-6(7–3) in the tournament's third round. Sampras had what would end up being his best run ever at that year's French Open, defeating two past former champions Sergi Bruguera and Jim Courier (in 5 sets on both occasions and overcoming a 2-0 deficit against the latter) before losing in a semifinal match to the eventual winner, Yevgeny Kafelnikov, 7-6(7–4), 6–0, 6–2.

In the eight Wimbledons inclusive between 1993 and 2000, 1996 was the only year that Sampras would fail to win the championship at Wimbledon. Sampras lost in the quarterfinals of Wimbledon to the eventual winner, Richard Krajicek, the tournament's 17th-seed. The match lasted three long sets, with Krajicek winning 7–5, 7–6(7–3), 6–4.

In the quarterfinals of the US Open, Sampras vomited on the court at 1–1 in the final set tiebreak (due to dehydration) while facing Àlex Corretja; nonetheless, Sampras would win that match. Sampras advanced to the finals, where he defeated No. 2 Michael Chang to defend his US Open title.

Sampras finished off the year by claiming the season-ending ATP Tour World Championship for the third time in his career.

1997: Australian and Wimbledon titles
Sampras won his second Australian Open title in January, defeating Carlos Moyá in the final. In July, he won Wimbledon for the fourth time, defeating Cédric Pioline in the final. Sampras also won singles titles in San Jose, Philadelphia, Cincinnati, Munich, and Paris, and the ATP Tour World Championships in Hanover, Germany. He became the only player to win both the Grand Slam Cup and the ATP Tour World Championships in the same year.

He had a 10–1 win–loss record against top-10 opponents and was undefeated in eight singles finals. He held the No. 1 ranking for the entire year and joined Jimmy Connors (1974–1978) as the only male players to hold the year-end No. 1 ranking for five consecutive years. His prize money earnings of US$6,498,211 for the year was a career high.

1998: Wimbledon title, six straight years No. 1 
In 1998, Sampras's No. 1 ranking was challenged by Chilean player Marcelo Ríos. Sampras failed to defend his Australian Open title, losing in the quarterfinals to Karol Kučera, and won Wimbledon only after a hard-fought five-set victory over Goran Ivanišević.

Sampras lost in the final of the Cincinnati Masters to Patrick Rafter after a controversial line call. Sampras faced Rafter again in the semifinals of the US Open, losing in five sets after sustaining injury while leading the match two sets to one, and Rafter went on to win his second consecutive US Open title. Sampras lost another semifinal at the Tennis Masters Cup to eventual champion Àlex Corretja. Nevertheless, Sampras finished the year as the top-ranked player for the sixth year in a row.

1999: Wimbledon title
The year started with a withdrawal from the Australian Open due to fatigue, and Sampras failed to win a title during the early part of the season. However, he then went on a 24-match winning streak encompassing the Stella Artois Championships, Wimbledon (equaling Roy Emerson's record of 12 Grand Slam singles titles), Los Angeles, and Cincinnati (a rematch of the previous year's final with Patrick Rafter). Sampras' victory over Andre Agassi in the Wimbledon final is often cited as one of the greatest performances in a Wimbledon final. Despite this—on account of a herniated disc in his back forcing retirements at the RCA Championships and the US Open—he lost his no. 1 ranking to Agassi the following day, when the ATP Tour rankings were updated.

Sampras' ranking was hurt by a combination of withdrawing from the Australian and US Opens, tournaments in which he had strong performances during the previous year, and the resurgence of longtime rival Agassi, putting an end to Sampras' six consecutive years of finishing as world No. 1. Agassi took over the top ranking and held it for the rest of the season, but Sampras recovered and managed to beat Agassi in the year-end championships for the fifth and final time, enabling him to remain third in the rankings.

2000:  13 majors and return to No. 1
Sampras reached the semifinals of the Australian Open in early 2000, falling to the eventual champion Agassi in a five-set match. He won the Ericsson Open for the third time in March. After getting knocked out in the first round at the French Open, he won his seventh and final title  at Wimbledon, battling through tendinitis in his right shin and a painful back injury in the process equalling the then all time gentleman's singles title record of William Renshaw. In the final, Sampras was a set down and 4-1 down in the second set tie break against Patrick Rafter, but went on to win in four sets. This was his 13th Grand Slam singles title, breaking the all-time record of Roy Emerson that had stood for over 30 years.

In the 2000 US Open, Sampras overcame Richard Krajicek in four sets at the quarterfinals (including a comeback from 2-6 down in a tiebreaker), and upcoming star Lleyton Hewitt in the semi-finals, but lost the final to Marat Safin. Sampras' run to the final briefly returned him to the No. 1 ranking, but Gustavo Kuerten ended the year atop the rankings. This would be the last time Sampras was ranked No. 1, extending his ATP record career total to 286 weeks. (The record was surpassed by Roger Federer in 2012.)

2001: Drop in ranking
Sampras' 31-match Wimbledon win streak ended in a five set loss to Roger Federer, aged 19, in the fourth round; this was the only time the two tennis legends ever played an official professional match. At the US Open, Sampras reached the final but lost in straight sets to Lleyton Hewitt. Overall, this season was the first in 12 years that Sampras did not win a single title, and he finished the year ranked No. 10, also his lowest since 1989.

2002: 14th major and retirement
In 2002, Sampras suffered an early exit from Wimbledon, losing in the second round to No. 145 fast-court specialist George Bastl of Switzerland. After that loss, Sampras asked his former coach Paul Annacone to return and coach through the US Open. Sampras had a relatively poor summer leading up to the US Open, losing at Cincinnati to No. 70-ranked Wayne Arthurs in the second round, and then was eliminated at the opening round at Long Island by No. 85. Paul-Henri Mathieu.

At the US Open, Sampras was seeded 17th. Greg Rusedski, whom Sampras had defeated in a long five-set third round match at the US Open, said that Sampras was "a step and a half slower" and predicted that Sampras would lose his next match. Sampras, however, then defeated two young stars, Tommy Haas in the fourth round and Andy Roddick in the quarterfinals. He then defeated Sjeng Schalken in the semifinals to reach his third straight US Open final, and eighth US Open final overall, tying Ivan Lendl's all-time record. This time, he faced Agassi, whom he had met in his very first Grand Slam final 12 years earlier. After a four-set battle between the two veterans, Sampras claimed a then-record 14th Grand Slam singles title and matched Jimmy Connors' Open Era record of five US Open singles championships.

Sampras did not compete in any tour events in the following 12 months, but he did not officially announce his retirement until August 2003, just prior to the US Open. He chose not to defend his title there, but his retirement announcement was timed so that he could say farewell at a special ceremony organized for him at the Open. He thus became the only man to win the final Grand Slam tournament at which he competed. At the time of his retirement, many regarded Sampras as the greatest player of all time.

Career summary
Sampras won 64 top-level singles titles (including 14 Grand Slam titles, 11 Super 9/ATP Masters Series/ATP World Tour Masters 1000 titles and five Tennis Masters Cup titles) and two doubles titles. He was ranked the world No. 1 for a total of 286 weeks (the third most in the Open Era after Novak Djokovic and Roger Federer) and was year-end No. 1 for an ATP record six consecutive years from 1993 through 1998.

Sampras was known for his natural attacking serve-and-volley game, all-round game, and strong competitive instinct. Sampras's best surface was undoubtedly the fast-playing grass courts, Sampras won seven Wimbledon Gentleman's Singles titles (1993–95, 1997–2000), broken only by a loss in the 1996 quarterfinals to eventual winner Richard Krajicek. Sampras's seven Wimbledon Gentleman's Singles titles, tied with William Renshaw and Novak Djokovic, has only been surpassed by Federer who won a record eighth Gentleman's Singles title in 2017.  Sampras is lauded by many tennis analysts as one of the greatest male grass-court players of all time. Sampras also shares the record of five US Open titles in the Open Era with Jimmy Connors and Federer. He won back-to-back US Open titles in 1995 and 1996, despite vomiting on the court at 1–1 in the final set tiebreak due to dehydration in the 1996 quarterfinals against Àlex Corretja. Combined with his two Australian Open titles, this gave Sampras a total of fourteen majors won on grass and hard courts.

Sampras's only real weakness was on clay courts, where the slow surface tempered his natural attacking serve-and-volley game. His best performance at the French Open came in 1996, when he lost a semifinal match to the eventual winner, Yevgeny Kafelnikov. Despite his limited success at Roland Garros, Sampras did win some significant matches on clay. He won a 1992 clay court tournament in Kitzbühel, defeating Alberto Mancini in the final. He won the prestigious Italian Open in 1994, defeating Boris Becker in the final, and two singles matches in the 1995 Davis Cup final against Russians Andrei Chesnokov and Yevgeny Kafelnikov in Moscow. Sampras also won a 1998 clay court tournament in Atlanta, defeating Jason Stoltenberg in the final.

Post-retirement activity

On April 6, 2006, three and a half years after his retirement, Sampras resurfaced and played his first exhibition match in River Oaks, Houston, Texas, against 23-year-old Robby Ginepri. Ginepri won the match in two sets. Sampras later announced that he would be playing in World Team Tennis events.

In 2007, Sampras was announcing that he would play in a few events on the Outback Champions Series, a group of tournaments for former ATP players who have met certain criteria during their careers. Sampras won his first two events on tour, defeating Todd Martin in both finals (one of which included Sampras's first trip to his ancestral homeland, Greece). Many observers noted that despite Sampras’ lengthy layoff from competitive tournaments, he still possessed many of the previous skills he had displayed while on the ATP tour, with commentator John McEnroe going as far as to say that Sampras would be worthy of a top five seeding at Wimbledon were he to enter the tournament.

On November 20, 2007, Sampras lost the first of three exhibition matches in Asia against then world #1 Roger Federer in Seoul, Korea. Two days later in Kuala Lumpur, Sampras again lost to Federer in two tiebreaks. However, Sampras was able to win the last match of the series, winning in two sets on fast carpet.

On February 18, 2008, in an exhibition match during the SAP Open, Sampras defeated another active player, former No. 2 Tommy Haas. Sampras dispatched the German in 43 minutes.

On March 10, 2008, Sampras played another exhibition match against No. 1 Roger Federer at Madison Square Garden in New York City. Sampras once again lost the match in three tight sets.

In 2009, Sampras won two Outback Champions Series titles. He defeated McEnroe in the final of the Champions Cup Boston in February and Patrick Rafter in the final of The Del Mar Development Champions Cup in March.

Sampras was present at the 2009 Wimbledon final between Andy Roddick and Roger Federer to witness Federer eclipse his mark of 14 major titles and become the most successful man in Grand Slam history. His record of 14 majors had lasted for seven years.

The following year along with Federer, Andre Agassi and Rafael Nadal, Sampras played an exhibition doubles match at Indian Wells to raise money for the people of Haiti who had been affected by the earthquake.

In November 2010, Sampras reported that many of his trophies and memorabilia had been stolen from a West Los Angeles public storage facility. The loss included the trophy from his first Australian Open victory, two Davis Cups, an Olympic ring and six trophies for finishing top in the year-end rankings. Most of the stolen items have since been recovered and returned.

On November 17, 2011, Sampras played and lost an exhibition match against Milos Raonic. His serve approached 200 km/h (124 mph) throughout the night.

Rivalries

Sampras vs. Agassi

The rivalry has been called the greatest of the generation of players competing in the 1990s, as they were the most successful players of that decade, and had a contrasting playing style, with both Sampras and Agassi being respectively considered the greatest server and the greatest serve returner of their eras. Sampras won 20 of the 34 matches he played against Agassi.

The 1990 US Open was their first meeting in a Grand Slam tournament final. Agassi was favored because he was ranked No. 4, compared to the No. 12 ranking of Sampras and because Agassi had defeated Sampras in their only previously completed match. However, Agassi lost the final to Sampras in straight sets.

Their next meeting in a Grand Slam was at the 1992 French Open, where they met in the quarterfinals. Although Sampras was higher ranked, Agassi prevailed in straight sets. Their next Grand Slam meeting was at the quarterfinals of Wimbledon in 1993, where Agassi was the defending champion and Sampras was the newly minted No. 1. Sampras prevailed in five sets, and went on to win his first Wimbledon championship.

With both Sampras and Agassi participating, the U.S. won the Davis Cup in 1995. Notable Sampras-Agassi matches of 1995 included the finals of the Australian Open, the Newsweek Champions Cup, the Lipton International Players Championships, the Canadian Open, and the US Open, with Sampras winning the Newsweek Champions Cup and the US Open.

The next time Sampras and Agassi met in a Grand Slam final was at Wimbledon in 1999, where Sampras won in straight sets. For both, it was considered a career rejuvenation, as Sampras had suffered a string of disappointments in the last year while Agassi was regaining his status as a top-ranked player after winning the French Open. Sampras forfeited the No. 1 ranking to Agassi when injury forced Sampras to withdraw from that year's US Open, which Agassi went on to win. They faced each other twice in the season-ending ATP Tour World Championships, with Sampras losing the round-robin match, but winning the final.

They played each other only once in 2000. The top-ranked Agassi defeated No. 3 Sampras in the semifinals of the Australian Open in five sets.

In arguably their most memorable match, Sampras defeated Agassi in the 2001 US Open quarterfinals 6–7, 7–6, 7–6, 7–6. There were no breaks of serve during the entire match. Reruns of the match are frequently featured on television, especially during US Open rain delays.

The final of the 2002 US Open was their first meeting in a US Open final since 1995. The match was also notable because they had defeated several up-and-coming players en route to the final. Sampras had defeated No. 3 Tommy Haas in the fourth round and future No. 1 Andy Roddick in the quarterfinals, while Agassi had defeated No. 1 and defending champion Lleyton Hewitt in the semifinals. Sampras defeated Agassi in four sets. This was the final ATP tour singles match of Sampras's career.

In August 2010, Sampras played an exhibition game with Agassi at the indoor arena Coliseo Cubierto El Campin in Bogotá, Colombia.

Sampras vs. Rafter
Sampras won 12 of the 16 matches he played against Patrick Rafter, including eight of their first nine, and their final four meetings.

In 1997, Rafter won the US Open, a tournament that many expected Sampras to win, having won in 1995 and 1996. The win catapulted Rafter to the year-end no. 2 rankings behind Sampras. Seven-time Grand Slam champion John McEnroe believed Rafter to be a "one-slam wonder", since it was only his second career ATP title. Up to that point, Sampras was 5–1 against Rafter, and defeated Rafter three times in fall 1997 to solidify his No. 1 ATP ranking. "We're not the best of mates," Rafter said of Sampras after 1997 Davis Cup semifinals, "I wouldn't go out for a beer with him, put it that way. I don't know what the story is. There's a bit of feeling."

In 1998, Rafter came back from a set down to defeat Sampras in the Cincinnati Masters final, a title that Sampras needed to win in order get the maximum ranking points to stay No. 1 ahead of Marcelo Ríos. During that match, Rafter's serve was called out, but the umpire overruled the call to give Rafter the ace and the Cincinnati title. Sampras was displeased, and stood at the baseline for several seconds, making the victorious Rafter wait at the net, and then refused to shake the umpire's hand. Sampras, at the time winner of 11 Grand Slams, when asked about the difference between himself and Rafter, said "Ten grand slams", that a controversial line-call cost him the match, and that a player had to come back and win another Grand Slam title in order to be considered great. Rafter went on to win the Canada Masters as well, earning the third seed at the 1998 US Open.

The two met in the semifinals of the 1998 US Open, where Sampras was slowed in the third set by a leg injury and called for a trainer, and Rafter broke Sampras twice in the deciding fifth set.  Sampras's loss denied him the chance to match two records—Jimmy Connors' mark of five U.S. Open titles and Roy Emerson's record of 12 Grand Slam singles titles. Sampras cited a leg injury as the reason Rafter won, an attitude that upset the Australian: "He really does say some funny things at the wrong time", said Rafter, "We are out there busting our guts and he doesn't show a lot of respect at the end of the day. He tries to play down the reason why he lost, giving no respect to the other player, and that is what really upsets me about him and the reason I try to piss him off as much as I can." Following Rafter's successful defense of his 1997 U.S. Open title by defeating Mark Philippoussis in the 1998 final, when asked about Sampras' earlier comments about having to win another Grand Slam in order to be considered great, Rafter replied: "Maybe you can ask him that question, if he thinks that now. For me, I won another Slam, and it hasn't sunk in yet. It's very, very exciting for me, especially to repeat it". For his part, Sampras said about Rafter, "When I see him holding the US Open trophy, it pisses me off." Rafter responded by calling Sampras a "cry baby" and saying that it would be better for tennis if someone besides the American were No. 1. Some had suggested at the time that the Sampras-Rafter feud was inflamed by the media since Sampras' traditional rival Andre Agassi was still in the midst of a comeback from injury.

Sampras, whose struggles from 1998 continued over to early 1999, lost a third consecutive time against Rafter at the World Team Cup, in straight sets, just before the French Open. By the summer of 1999 having rebuilt his confidence, en route to compiling a 24-match winning streak of four titles including Wimbledon, Sampras prevailed against Rafter in the Cincinnati Masters final, a rematch of the previous year's final, and the two were friendly in the trophy ceremony. Later that summer, Sampras withdrew from the U.S. Open due to an injured back, while Rafter retired in the first round as a result of a torn rotator cuff.

The next Sampras-Rafter match was the 2000 Wimbledon final, after Rafter overcame Agassi in the semifinals, a four-set final which included a 26-minute rain delay. Both players had flown in their parents for the Wimbledon final, the first time in years they would see their sons play. Sampras lost the first-set tiebreaker, and trailed in the second-set tiebreaker 1-4 before taking 5 consecutive points to win that set, then won the third and fourth sets for the Championship, with just 10 minutes of daylight left. That victory gave Sampras his 13th Grand Slam title, breaking the record of 12 by Roy Emerson for the most Grand Slam titles. After the match ended, Sampras called Rafter "all class, on and off the court", while Rafter said he was lucky to overcome early season injuries to make the final.

Sampras and Rafter met in the fourth round of the 2001 US Open, with Sampras winning.

Playing style
Sampras was an all-court player who would often serve and volley. Possessing an all-around skill, in the early years of his career, when not serving, his strategy was to be offensive from the baseline, put opponents in a defensive position, and finish points at the net. In his later years, he became even more offensive and would either employ a chip-and-charge strategy or try to hit an offensive shot on the return and follow his return to the net.

He had an accurate and powerful first serve – widely considered among players, commentators and fans as one of the best of all time. He had great disguise on both his first and second serves, and his second serve was nearly as powerful as his first. He was known for producing aces on critical points, even with his second serves.

Sampras was able to hit winners from both his forehand and backhand from all over the court. He was able to catch attacks wide to his forehand using his speed and hitting a forehand shot on the run. When successfully executed, he won many points outright or put opponents immediately on the defensive, due to the considerable pace and flat nature of the shot. This style did not help him on clay courts, according to some critics.

Equipment
Sampras used one racket type, the Wilson Pro Staff Original, for his entire professional career—a racket first introduced in 1983. He played with Babolat natural gut, with all his rackets re-strung before each match (used or not) at 75 lbs tension (more or less, depending on conditions). His rackets had weight added to bring them close to 400 g, but the frame proper was a production model manufactured at a Wilson factory on the Caribbean island of St. Vincent. The handles were custom-built.

Post-retirement, Sampras has used a slightly modified Pro Staff Tour 90 and, from 2008, a new version of the original Pro Staff, produced with in-between head size of 88 square inches and heavier weight at 349 grams unstrung.

Since mid-2010, Sampras has been spotted at multiple exhibitions playing with a Babolat Pure Storm Tour, along with Babolat's popular RPM Blast strings.

"I need a little more pop...I need it if I'm going to play some tennis," he said after playing Gaël Monfils in an exhibition at the SAP Open.

During a good part of 2011, Sampras used a racquet that was painted all black, with Tourna Grip and Tourna Damper.

In the late 1980s, Sampras signed a three-year endorsement contract with Sergio Tacchini. It was extended to five years before Sampras signed with Nike in 1994. He wore Nike apparel and Nike Air Oscillate footwear on court.

Personal life
Sampras's mother was born in Greece and his father was born in the United States to a Greek father and Jewish mother. His older sister, Stella Sampras Webster, is the women's tennis head coach at UCLA, and his younger sister, Marion, is a teacher in Los Angeles. His older brother, Gus, has been tournament director at the Scottsdale ATP event. In 2007 he became president of the firm managing Pete's business activities.

On September 30, 2000, Sampras married American actress and former Miss Teen USA Bridgette Wilson. On November 21, 2002, their son, Christian Charles Sampras, was born. On July 29, 2005, the couple had their second son, Ryan Nikolaos Sampras. They reside in Lake Sherwood, California.

Sampras has β-thalassemia minor, a genetic trait that sometimes causes mild anemia.

Politically, Sampras is a Republican. He supported John McCain in 2008.

Career statistics

Grand Slam performance timeline

Grand Slam finals 18 (14 titles, 4 runner-ups)

Legacy
Due to his achievements, Sampras is regarded by many as one of the greatest tennis players in the history of the sport. In particular, he is remembered for his excellent technique and his mastery of the serve-and-volley playstyle. Sampras is considered to be one of the best serve-and-volley players in tennis history.

Records and achievements

Records
 These records were attained in Open Era of tennis.
 Records in bold indicate peer-less achievements.

Professional awards
 ATP Player of the Year: 1993, 1994, 1995, 1996, 1997, 1998.
 ITF World Champion: 1993, 1994, 1995, 1996, 1997, 1998.

Other achievements
 Sampras (1997–2000) won four consecutive Wimbledon singles titles, equal to Novak Djokovic and second only to Björn Borg and Roger Federer (who have five consecutive titles each).
 During the Open Era, only Borg (1978–81 French Open and 1976–80 Wimbledon), Sampras (1997–2000 Wimbledon), Federer (2003–07 Wimbledon and 2004–08 US Open), Rafael Nadal (2005–08 French Open, 2010–14 French Open and 2017–20 French Open) and Djokovic (2018–2022 Wimbledon) have won at least one Grand Slam tournament four consecutive times.
 Ken Rosewall, Sampras and Nadal are the only men to have won Grand Slam singles titles as a teenager, in their 20s, and in their 30s.
 Sampras won 40 of the 42 singles matches he played on Wimbledon's Centre Court and 63 of the 70 singles matches he played at the All England Club. His two defeats on Centre Court were against Goran Ivanišević at the 1992 Wimbledon Championships, and Federer at the 2001 Wimbledon Championships. 
 Sampras is the only player to win all seven Wimbledon finals he played. In terms of most finals won at a single Grand Slam tournament without losing any, he is third in the Open Era behind Novak Djokovic (who won all ten of his Australian Open finals) and Nadal (who won all fourteen of his French Open finals)

Other awards
Summary of professional awards.
 U.S. Olympic Committee "Sportsman of the Year" in 1997. He was the first tennis player to receive this award.
 GQ Magazine's Individual Athlete Award for Man of the Year in 2000.
 Selected the No. 1 player (of 25 players) in the past 25 years by a panel of 100 current and past players, journalists, and tournament directors to commemorate the 25th anniversary of the ATP in 1997.
 Voted 48th athlete of Top 50 Greatest North American Athletes of ESPN's SportsCentury (also youngest on list).
 In 2005, TENNIS Magazine named Sampras the greatest tennis player for the period 1965 through 2005, from its list, "The 40 Greatest Players of the TENNIS Era".

See also

 List of Grand Slam men's singles champions
 All-time tennis records – men's singles
 Open Era tennis records – men's singles

Notes

References

Further reading

Further viewing
 Wimbledon Classic Match: Federer vs Sampras (2001) Standing Room Only, DVD Release Date: October 31, 2006, Run Time: 233 minutes, ASIN: B000ICLR98.
 Legends of Wimbledon – Pete Sampras (2006) Standing Room Only, DVD Release Date: October 31, 2006, Run Time: 60 minutes, ASIN: B000ICLR84.
 The Netjets Showdown: Pete Sampras vs. Roger Federer (2008) Arts Alliance Amer, DVD Release Date: April 22, 2008, Run Time: 180 minutes, ASIN: B0013PVGN6.

External links

 
 
 
 
 
 Text, Audio, Video of Sampras' International Tennis Hall of Fame Induction Speech

1971 births
Living people
American male tennis players
American people of Greek descent
American people of Polish-Jewish descent
Australian Open (tennis) champions
California Republicans
Grand Slam (tennis) champions in men's singles
International Tennis Hall of Fame inductees
Olympic tennis players of the United States
People from Potomac, Maryland
Sportspeople from Los Angeles County, California
Sportspeople from Maryland
Tennis players from Washington, D.C.
Tennis players at the 1992 Summer Olympics
US Open (tennis) champions
Washington (state) Republicans
Wimbledon champions
People from Palos Verdes, California
20th-century American Jews
21st-century American Jews
ATP number 1 ranked singles tennis players
ITF World Champions